Gutierre is an old Spanish male given name. The surname Gutiérrez is derived from this name.

Notable people
Notable people with the name include:
 Gutierre Álvarez de Toledo, Spanish priest
 Gutierre de Cetina (1519–1554), Spanish poet and soldier
 Gutierre de Hevia (d. 1772), Spanish military man
 Gutierre de Miranda, Spanish governor
 Gutierre de Vargas Carvajal (1506-1559), Spanish priest
 Gutierre Fernández (fl. 1084–1117), Leonese nobleman
 Gutierre Fernández de Castro (fl. 1124–66), Castilian nobleman
 Gutierre Menéndez, Galician nobleman
 Gutierre Núñez, Castilian nobleman
 Gutierre Rodríguez de Castro (d. 1195), Castilian nobleman
 Gutierre Tibón (1905–1999), Italian-Mexican author
 Gutierre Vermúdez (died 1130), Leonese nobleman

See also
Gutierre-Muñoz, Spain

References

Spanish masculine given names